Kopyl is a rural locality (a selo) and the administrative center of Alexandrovskoye Rural Settlement, Ertilsky District, Voronezh Oblast, Russia. The population was 537 as of 2010. There are 16 streets.

Geography 
Kopyl is located on the left bank of the Tokay River, 31 km southeast of Ertil (the district's administrative centre) by road. Tambovka is the nearest rural locality.

References 

Rural localities in Ertilsky District